Great Famine may refer to:

China
 Great Chinese Famine (1958–1961)

Greece
 Great Famine (Greece) (1941–1944)

India
 Great Bengal famine of 1770
 Great Rajputana Famine (1869)
 Great Famine of 1876–1878

Ireland
 Great Famine (Ireland) (1845–1852), occasion for the great exodus of Irish and the Irish diaspora

Japan
 Kan'ei Great Famine (1640–1643)
 Great Tenmei famine (1782–1788)
 Tenpō famine or Great Tenpō famine (1833–1837)

Lebanon
 Great Famine of Mount Lebanon (1915–1918)

North Korea
 North Korean famine (1994–1998)

Northern Europe
 Great Famine of 1315–1317
 Great Famine of 1695–1697

Ukraine
 Holodomor or the Great Famine of 1932–1933

Other uses
 The Great Famine, a 2011 documentary about the Russian famine of 1921

See also
 Droughts and famines in Russia and the Soviet Union
 List of famines